Events from the year 1938 in Austria

Incumbents
President: Wilhelm Miklas (until March 13)
Chancellor: Kurt Schuschnigg (until March 11), Arthur Seyss-Inquart (March 11-March 13)

Governors
 Burgenland: Hans Sylvester  (until 11 March)
 Carinthia: Arnold Sucher  (until 11 March)
 Lower Austria: Josef Reither  (until 12 March)
 Salzburg: Franz Rehrl (until 12 March); Rolph Trommer (3 March-12 March)
 Styria: Karl Maria Stepan (until 12 March)
 Tyrol: Josef Schumacher (until 12 March)
 Upper Austria: Heinrich Gleißner (until 11 March)
 Vienna: Richard Schmitz (until 11 March)
 Vorarlberg: Ernst Winsauer (until 12 March)

Events

 February 12 – Chancellor Kurt von Schuschnigg meets Adolf Hitler at Berchtesgaden and is forced to yield to German demands for greater Nazi participation in the Austrian government.
 March 12 – Anschluss: German troops occupy Austria; annexation is declared the following day.
 In a result, the Austrian electorate in a national referendum approved Anschluss by an 99.73%.
 July – The Mauthausen concentration camp is built.

Births
 9 October – Heinz Fischer, politician
 13 October – Christiane Hörbiger, actress

Deaths

References

 
Years of the 20th century in Austria